Lewis MacLeod (born 4 July 1970) is a Scottish actor. He is known for voicing various characters in Dead Ringers, Newzoids and 64 Zoo Lane and Master Pud in Little Big Planet 3.

Voice work
He voices characters such as Sebulba from Star Wars: Episode I – The Phantom Menace, Postman Pat & Various in 64 Zoo Lane. He can also be heard as the Earl on Cartoon Network's Skatoony, as well as comedy sketches for BBC Radio, including BBC Radio Scotland's Off the Ball, Bigipedia,  Safety Catch for BBC Radio 4, Newsjack for BBC Radio 7, Mario Abdullah-Levy in the BBC Comedy Series Look Around You and Mr. Happy (singing voice) and Mr. Stubborn from The Mr. Men Show. He also provided the voices of Principal Brown, Rocky Robinson, Mr. Small, Miss Simian, and the Doughnut Sheriff in season 1 of Cartoon Network's The Amazing World of Gumball and Will in Everything's Rosie.

In 1998, MacLeod voiced the Martians in Jeff Wayne's The War of the Worlds. A real-time strategy PC game, based on Jeff Wayne's Musical Version of The War of the Worlds. Some of MacLeod's dialogue he recorded, would later be re-used in the live tours, ULLAdubULLA The Remix Album and The New Generation.

He regularly appears on BBC Radio 2's Steve Wright in the Afternoon voicing impressions of Donald Trump, Jeremy Vine and Paul McCartney. His other celebrity impressions include Bill Clinton, Barack Obama, Christopher Walken, Gordon Brown, Boris Johnson and George Galloway.

He was also the original voice of the main character and protagonist Bimble in the first season of CITV, HTV and Martin Gates Productions's animated series Bimble's Bucket. When the series returned for a second season he was replaced by Paul Panting.

He is currently the voice of Postman Pat, replacing Ken Barrie, who died in July 2016.

He is the voice of the advisor in the 1999 video game Theme Park World.

The Characters he Played in 64 Zoo Lane were Boris the Bear and various in the US version by Lobster Films.

His acting credits include 16 Years of Alcohol and The Purifiers directed by Richard Jobson as well as Happy Holidays and Terri McIntyre for BBC Scotland.

MacLeod worked for a while with the Star Wars universe. He reprised his role as Sebulba in the video games: Star Wars Episode I: Racer, Star Wars: Super Bombad Racing, Star Wars Racer Revenge and Lego Star Wars: The Video Game via uncredited archived sounds and also played Jedi master Obi-Wan Kenobi in the video games: Star Wars: Obi-Wan,Star Wars: Galactic Battlegrounds and Star Wars: Super Bombad Racing, a role previously played by Alec Guinness in the Star Wars Original Trilogy and later by fellow Scottish actor Ewan McGregor in the Star Wars Prequel Trilogy and Lego Star Wars: The Video Game.

He also voiced Draco Malfoy, Albus Dumbledore, Fred Weasley and George Weasley in various Harry Potter video games, including Philosopher's Stone, Chamber of Secrets, Prisoner of Azkaban, Goblet of Fire, and Order of the Phoenix.

Since 2014, he has voiced various characters in Dead Ringers, numerous celebrities in ITV's Newzoids and various animals in CBBC's The Zoo.

Since 2018 he has voiced the character of Ramone Tarmine on Clinton Baptiste's Paranormal Podcast; a live stage show is planned for the autumn of 2022.

In the simulation game Planet Coaster, he voices the entertainer King Coaster. along with the main manager, Oswald B. Thompson

Acting
MacLeod plays Paul McCartney in the Beatles sketches in the third series of Harry & Paul for the BBC. He appears as an annoyed airplane passenger in the Better Things episode "Jesus Saves".

Personal life
MacLeod lives in London. He and his ex-wife Victoria Lumsden have two daughters.

References

External links

Lewis Macleod - British Comedy Guide

1970 births
Living people
Male actors from Glasgow
People from Torrance, East Dunbartonshire
Scottish male film actors
Scottish male television actors
Scottish male video game actors
Scottish male voice actors
20th-century Scottish male actors
21st-century Scottish male actors